Alice Coutinho (born 13 September 2000) is a French racing cyclist, who currently rides for French amateur team VC Morteau-Montbenoît. In October 2020, she rode in the women's edition of the 2020 Liège–Bastogne–Liège race in Belgium.

References

External links

2000 births
Living people
French female cyclists
Place of birth missing (living people)